The Qing dynasty was an imperial Chinese dynasty ruled by the Aisin Gioro clan of Manchu ethnicity. Officially known as the Great Qing, the dynastic empire was also widely known in English as China and the Chinese Empire both during its existence, especially internationally, and after the fall of the dynasty.

Earlier names 

In 1616 Nurhaci declared himself the "Bright Khan" of the Later Jin state (Jurchen/Manchu: Amaga Aisin gurun) in honor both of the 12–13th century Jurchen-led Jin dynasty and of his Aisin Gioro clan (Aisin being Manchu for the Chinese  (jīn, "gold")).  The dynasty became known as the Later Jin dynasty by historians. His son Hong Taiji renamed the dynasty Great Qing in 1636, which established its capital in Beijing in 1644. It soon completely conquered the Southern Ming.

Origin of the name Qing 

The name Great Qing first appeared in 1636. There are competing explanations on the meaning of Qīng (lit. "clear" or "pure"). The name may have been selected in reaction to the name of the Ming dynasty, which is composed  of elements  "sun" and "moon", both associated with the fire element of the Chinese zodiacal system. The character Qīng is composed of "water" and "azure", both associated with the water element. This association would justify the Qing conquest as defeat of fire by water. The water imagery of the new name may also have had Buddhist overtones of perspicacity and enlightenment and connections with the Bodhisattva Manjusri. "Qing" is also the name of several rivers in Manchuria, at one of which Nurhaci won a key battle in 1619. It may also be possible to come from the Manchu name daicing, which may have been derived from a Mongolian word that means "warrior".

The name China for the Qing 

After conquering China, the Manchus commonly called their state Zhongguo (lit. "Central State" or "Middle Kingdom"), and referred to it as Dulimbai Gurun in Manchu (Dulimbai means "central" or "middle," gurun means "nation" or "state"). The emperors equated the lands of the Qing state (including present day Northeast China, Xinjiang, Mongolia, Tibet and other areas) as Zhongguo in both the Chinese and Manchu languages, defining China as a multi-ethnic state, and rejecting the idea that Zhongguo only meant Han areas. The Qing emperors proclaimed that both Han and non-Han peoples were part of Zhongguo. They used both Zhongguo and "Qing" to refer to their state in official documents. "Chinese language" (Dulimbai gurun i bithe) included Chinese, Manchu, and Mongol languages, and "Chinese people" (Manchu: Dulimbai gurun i niyalma) referred to all subjects of the empire.

When the Qing conquered Dzungaria in 1759, they proclaimed that the new land was absorbed into "China" (Dulimbai Gurun) in a Manchu-language memorial. The Manchu-language version of the Convention of Kyakhta (1768), a treaty with the Russian Empire concerning criminal jurisdiction over bandits, referred to people from the Qing as "people from the Central Kingdom (Dulimbai Gurun)".

The Qing became widely known internationally in English as "China" or the "Chinese Empire", with China being the standard English translation of Zhongguo or Dulimbai Gurun. They were commonly used in international communications and treaties in addition to English-language mass media and newspapers etc. during the Qing.

List of names in English

Alternative names in English 
China
As a general term for the country. Applied to the Qing dynasty since the early Qing period.
Chinese Empire
As a general term for the imperial state. Applied to the Qing dynasty since the early Qing period.
Middle Kingdom
Translation of Chinese: , as a general term for the country. Applied to the Qing dynasty since the early Qing period.
Qing Empire, Ching Empire, or Ch'ing Empire
Mostly used when specifically referring to the empire. The three spellings (Qing, Ching, Ch'ing) are various romanizations for the same sound.
Empire of the Great Qing
Translation of Chinese: .
Great Qing
Translation of Chinese: , the "official name" in Chinese.
Great Qing state
Translation of Chinese:  or Manchu:
Manchu dynasty
Used by some westerners, similar to the name "Mongol dynasty" for the Yuan dynasty. Sometimes written as "Manchu Dynasty of China".
Manchu empire
Used by some westerners including some New Qing History scholars (alternatively rendered as "Manchoo empire" or "Mantchoo empire" in the 19th century). Also written as "Manchu empire of China". Additional names such as "Manchu Qing dynasty" or "Manchu Qing empire" are used for emphasizing the Manchuness of the Qing dynasty.

Historical names or romanizations officially used during the Qing dynasty in English 
Ta Tsing Empire
Appeared in certain treaties in English, using a different romanization than pinyin for the Chinese: part.
Tai Ching Ti Kuo
The transliteration of Chinese:  as appeared in some late Qing coins, using a different romanization than pinyin.
China
Appeared in most treaties, official documents etc.
Chinese Empire
Appeared in international treaties in English.
Empire of China
Appeared in certain treaties in English.

Other (unofficial) historical names in English 
Cathay
An alternative name for China as appeared in some English-language publications.
Celestial Empire
The translation of Chinese:  (a name for China) as appeared in North American and Australian mass media in the 19th century.
Tartary 
Early European writers used the term "Tartar" indiscriminately for all  the peoples of Northern Eurasia and referred to their lands as "Tartary". By the seventeenth century, however, largely under the influence of Catholic missionary writings, the word "Tartar" came to refer to the Manchus and the land they ruled as "Tartary."

Tartar Chinese Empire
Appeared in some English publications in the 19th century. Also rendered as "Chinese-Tartar empire" or simply "Chinese empire".
Tartar Chinese dynasty
Appeared in some English publications in the 19th century, or simply "Tartar dynasty (of China)" or "Chinese dynasty".
Manchu Tartar dynasty
Appeared in some English publications in the 19th century. Also rendered as "Manchoo Tartar dynasty","Mantchoo Tartar dynasty", "Tartar-Manchu dynasty", "Tartar-Mantchoo dynasty", or simply "Manchu dynasty", "Manchoo dynasty" or "Mantchoo dynasty".
Ta-tsing dynasty
Appeared in some English publications in the 19th century, using a different romanization than pinyin for the Chinese: part. Also rendered as "Tai-tsing dynasty".

Names in other languages within the Qing dynasty and contexts

Because the Qing dynasty was established by the Manchu people, a Tungusic people who saw themselves as heirs to both the Son of Heaven and earlier multi-ethnic empires, and because the empire had extended its control into Inner Asia, the court commonly used Chinese, Manchu, Mongol, Tibetan, and Uighur names for their realm.

The Qing dynasty was established in Chinese as Great Qing (大清) in 1636, but other Chinese names containing the name "Qing" had appeared in official documents such as treaties, including Da Qing Guo (大清國, "Great Qing State"), Da Qing Di Guo (大清帝國, "Empire of the Great Qing"), and Zhong Hua Da Qing Guo (中華大清國, "Chinese Great Qing State"), in addition to the name Zhongguo (中國). In the Chinese-language versions of its treaties and its maps of the world, the Qing government used "Qing" and "Zhongguo" interchangeably.

Apart from Zhongguo, the Qing court routinely used other terms as well in referring to its state in Chinese, such as guochao (國朝, lit. "state dynasty"), wojie (我界, "our territory"), and wochao (我朝) or benchao (本朝, lit. "our dynasty"). But it treated these titles and Zhongguo as interchangeable. For example, the Chinese version of the 1689 Treaty of Nerchinsk used Zhongguo as the state title, but in a different version of the same treaty, it was replaced by the term "our territory" (wojie): "All of the land to the south of the Xing’an mountains and all branches of the Heilong River belong to our territory" (wojie). The Manchu term Dulimbai gurun is the standard translation for the Chinese terms Zhongguo, Zhongyuan, and Hua and appeared in official documents produced by the Qing court beginning in 1689, if not earlier. 

The Manchu name for the state was Daicing Gurun. While the Manchurian name   Daiqing sounds like a phonetic rendering of Chinese Dà Qīng or Dai Ching, may in fact have been derived from a Mongolian word ", дайчин" that means "warrior". Daicing Gurun may therefore have meant "warrior state", a pun that was only intelligible to Manchu and Mongol people.  In the later part of the dynasty, however, even the Manchus themselves had forgotten this possible meaning. Similar to in the Chinese language, Dulimbai Gurun (the Manchu term for "Zhongguo" or "China") is used alongside Daicing Gurun to refer to the Qing dynasty during the Qing.

In the Mongolian language, the state was always known as "Чин улс" Ching ulus. Other Mongolian traditions used different terms for this empire: "Manj Chin uls" (Manchu Qing State), "Daichin uls", "Manj uls", "Chin uls", "our Great Qing", "Emperor's state", whereas "Han territory" was termed "Khyatad" or "Dundad uls". However, unlike in Chinese and Manchu languages, there was no exact counterpart for the name "Zhongguo" or "Dulimbai Gurun" in Mongolian during the Qing. The traditional Mongolian name for China is "Хятад" Khyatad, which only refers to the areas of native (Han) Chinese. Although the counterpart for the name "Zhongguo" or "Dulimbai Gurun" in Mongolian did appear as  Dumdadu ulus since 1735 in the works of bannerman Lomi and Injannashi, both of them limited "Dumdadu ulus" to the area south of the Great Wall, essentially the same as the word "Khyatad" in meaning. Similarly, there did not exist a counterpart for the name "Zhongguo" or "Dulimbai Gurun" in the Tibetan language during the Qing.

There are also derogatory names in some languages (mostly in Chinese and Mongolian) for the Qing, such as "манж Чин", "滿淸/满清" Mǎn Qīng, as used by anti-Qing, anti-Manchu revolutionaries.

Names in other languages
Apart from the English name of "China" or the "Chinese Empire", it is also known in similar names in other western languages such as Chine in French, Китаем in Russian, and Sinici Imperii in Latin, which are the standard translations for "China" or "Chinese Empire" in these languages. For example, in the Sino-Russian Treaty of Nerchinsk of 1689, the first international treaty signed by the Qing, the term "Китайском" meaning "Chinese" was used to refer to the Qing side in the Russian version of the treaty, and the term "Imperium Sinicum" meaning "Chinese Empire" was used to refer to the Qing empire in the Latin version of the treaty. Sometimes the names for "Great Qing" also appeared in such treaties. For example, the term "Imperii Tai-tscim" meaning "Empire of the Great Qing" appeared in the Latin version of the Treaty of Kyakhta (1727) along with "Sinenses" meaning "Chinese". In Japanese-language version of some treaties during the Qing dynasty, the Kanji for the Qing state (淸國, Shinkoku) was also used, although it is not found in Chinese-language version of treaties during the Qing dynasty (in Chinese version of the treaties the word for Great (大) always appeared before the word for Qing (淸).

See also
 Names of China
 Qing dynasty in Inner Asia

References

Works cited

 
 
 
 

Qing dynasty
Names of China
Qing
Qing